Reese Jackson McGuire (born March 2, 1995) is an American professional baseball catcher for the Boston Red Sox of Major League Baseball (MLB). He has previously played in MLB for the Toronto Blue Jays and Chicago White Sox.

McGuire was drafted by the Pittsburgh Pirates in the first round of the 2013 MLB draft, and was traded to the Blue Jays in 2016. He made his MLB debut for Toronto in 2018. The Blue Jays traded McGuire to the White Sox before the 2022 season, and the White Sox traded him to the Red Sox during the 2022 season.

Personal life

McGuire's older brother, Cash, played second base for Seattle University. His younger brother, Shane, played baseball at the University of San Diego as a catcher, was taken in the 2021 MLB draft, and is now in the Oakland Athletics organization.

In February 2020, McGuire was charged with a misdemeanor count of indecent exposure after he was found masturbating in his car in a shopping center parking lot in Dunedin, Florida, near the Blue Jays spring training complex. He pleaded no contest to a charge of disorderly conduct and was fined $500.

High school and international
McGuire attended Kentwood High School in Covington, Washington, where he played for the school's baseball team. He also played for the United States national baseball team in 18-and-under competitions, being named the player of the year as the United States won the International Baseball Federation 18-and-under Baseball World Championship. He won the USA Baseball Richard W. "Dick" Case Player of the Year Award in 2012. He had committed to attend the University of San Diego and play college baseball for the San Diego Toreros baseball team.

Professional career

Pittsburgh Pirates organization (2013–2016) 

Unlike other high school catchers, whose offensive skills were more developed than their defensive abilities, McGuire's skill behind the plate, as well as his left-handedness, made him an attractive target in the 2013 MLB Draft, and he was projected to be chosen in the first round. The Pittsburgh Pirates selected him 14th overall in the MLB draft, and he signed with the team on a $2.36 million contract. The team assigned McGuire to the Rookie-level Gulf Coast League (GCL) Pirates, where, in his professional baseball debut, he recorded four hits, three RBI, and two doubles. After batting .330 with 11 doubles and 21 RBI in 46 GCL games, McGuire was promoted to the Class A Short Season Jamestown Jammers of the New York–Penn League on August 31. He appeared in only four games there, going 4-for-16 in the process.

McGuire was one of several highly-rated Pirates prospects to play for the Low-A West Virginia Power of the South Atlantic League in 2014. While many of these other prospects, such as Luis Heredia, Austin Meadows, and Barrett Barnes spent time on the disabled list, McGuire remained healthy through the first half of the season, and after batting .277 with 19 RBI and a 19-game hitting streak, he was named a South Atlantic League midseason All-Star. He finished the 2014 season hitting .262 with 11 doubles, four triples, three home runs, and 45 RBI, and was promoted to the Bradenton Marauders of the Class A-Advanced Florida State League for the 2015 season. There, he batted .254 with 34 RBI in 98 games and 374 at bats, and received his third minor league All-Star selection, this time with the Florida State League.

After the regular 2015 minor league season, the Pirates sent McGuire to the Arizona Fall League to continue his development. In 14 games with the Glendale Desert Dogs, McGuire batted .294 with six RBI, striking out only 7 times in 51 at bats. He was also the youngest prospect chosen to play in the AFL All-Star Game. After spending spring training in 2016 with the Pirates, he joined the Double-A Altoona Curve for 77 games, during which he hit .259 with one home run and 37 RBI in 266 at bats.

Toronto Blue Jays (2016–2021)
On August 1, 2016, McGuire, fellow prospect Harold Ramirez, and pitcher Francisco Liriano were traded from the Pirates to the Toronto Blue Jays in exchange for pitcher Drew Hutchison. He finished out the season with the Double-A New Hampshire Fisher Cats, batting .226 with five RBI in 15 games and 53 at bats.

McGuire returned to the Fisher Cats for the 2017 season, but was limited to only 45 games after suffering a torn meniscus in his right knee that required arthroscopic surgery to repair. After suffering the knee injury in early May, McGuire was able to return to Double-A at the start of August, and shortly after his return, McGuire's home runs in three consecutive games earned him Eastern League Player of the Week honors for the week ending August 20. In his limited appearances in 2017, McGuire batted .295 with six home runs and 28 RBI in 149 at bats.

On November 20, 2017, the Blue Jays added McGuire to their 40-man roster, protecting him from the Rule 5 draft. He played for the Buffalo Bisons of the Triple-A International League in 2018. On September 6, 2018, the Blue Jays promoted McGuire to the major leagues. He made his MLB debut that night against the Cleveland Indians and hit a double in the game for his first career hit. He hit his first career home run on September 26 against the Houston Astros. In 14 major-league games, McGuire batted .290 with two home runs and four RBIs.

McGuire did not make the 2019 opening day roster and was optioned to Triple-A. McGuire joined the Blue Jays in late July after Luke Maile was injured, and appeared in 30 games throughout the season, hitting .299 with an .872 OPS. Overall with the 2020 Blue Jays, McGuire batted .073 with one home run and one RBI in 19 games.

On April 1, 2021, McGuire was designated for assignment by the Blue Jays. Clearing waivers, he was assigned to the Jays' alternate training site, before being assigned to Triple-A Buffalo on May 3. On May 5, McGuire was selected to Toronto’s active roster. With Toronto in 2021, McGuire played in 78 games, batting .253 with one home run and 10 RBIs.

In parts of four seasons with the Blue Jays, McGuire made 141 major-league appearances, batting .248 with nine home runs and 26 RBIs.

Chicago White Sox (2022)
On April 3, 2022, the Blue Jays traded McGuire to the Chicago White Sox for catcher Zack Collins. McGuire played in 53 games for Chicago, batting .225 with no home runs and 10 RBIs.

Boston Red Sox (2022–present)
On August 1, 2022, the Boston Red Sox acquired McGuire and a player to be named later or cash considerations in exchange for reliever Jake Diekman. McGuire played 36 games for the Red Sox in 2022, batting .337 with three home runs and 12 RBIs. Overall during 2022, McGuire batted .269 with three home runs and 22 RBIs in 89 major-league games.

On January 13, 2023, the Red Sox and McGuire reached agreement on a one-year contract, avoiding salary arbitration.

References

External links

1995 births
Living people
Águilas Cibaeñas players
Altoona Curve players
American expatriate baseball players in Canada
American expatriate baseball players in the Dominican Republic
Baseball players from Seattle
Boston Red Sox players
Bradenton Marauders players
Buffalo Bisons (minor league) players
Chicago White Sox players
Dunedin Blue Jays players
Glendale Desert Dogs players
Gulf Coast Blue Jays players
Gulf Coast Pirates players
Jamestown Jammers players
Kentwood High School (Washington) alumni
Major League Baseball catchers
New Hampshire Fisher Cats players
Toronto Blue Jays players
West Virginia Power players